The Kyushu proportional representation block (九州比例ブロック, Kyūshū hirei burokku) is one of eleven proportional representation (PR) blocks for the House of Representatives in the Diet of Japan. It consists of the Kyushu region and Okinawa prefecture (which includes Okinawa island and the Ryukyu Islands), and consists of the prefectures of Fukuoka, Saga, Nagasaki, Kumamoto, Ōita, Miyazaki, Kagoshima, and Okinawa. Proportional voting blocks were first introduced in the 1996 General Election. The block elects 21 members to the House of Representatives.

References 

Districts of the House of Representatives (Japan)
Kyushu region